The Cuyo Rugby Union (also known for its initials URC) is the organisational body that rules the game of rugby union in Mendoza Province, Argentina.

History 
It was founded in September 1945 and initially was the governing body of rugby also in the San Juan Province until the founding of Unión Sanjuanina de Rugby in September 1952

Provincial team 

The Unión de Rugby de Cuyo is represented in the Campeonato Argentino, a competition in which each of the 24 unions that make up the Unión Argentina de Rugby (UAR) participate.

Titles 
Campeonato Argentino: 1
 2004

References

External links
Official website

Cuy
Sports organizations established in 1945
1945 establishments in Argentina